is a book and magazine publisher specializing in politics, economics and business, based in Tokyo, Japan.

The company is famous for  established in 1895, one of three Japanese leading business magazines ranked with  published by Nikkei Business Publications and  published by DIAMOND.

Major magazines, websites and services 

 Weekly Toyo Keizai, Japan’s oldest business magazine published since 1895.
 Kaisha Shikiho, Japanese company quarterly handbook which provides comprehensive earnings forecasts information for all listed companies in Japan.
 TOYOKEIZAI ONLINE, One of the largest websites for economics and business in Japan.
 Toyo Keizai Data Services,  Data provider of economic and corporate data.

References

External links 
 
 Toyo Keizai company profile
 JAPAN COMPANY HANDBOOK
 Toyo Keizai Data Services
 Kaisha Shikiho

Book publishing companies in Tokyo
Magazine publishing companies in Tokyo